"Did Ya" is a song by the English rock band The Kinks, appearing on the EP of the same name, as well as some editions of Phobia.

Release

"Did Ya" first saw release on October 24, 1991, in numerous different formats (all of which were the first that The Kinks released on Columbia Records.) In America, the song was the title track of a five-song EP. This five track EP was instead made into a CD maxi-single in Europe. Instead of this five song lineup, however, the song was released as a single in the Netherlands, backed with a rerecording of The Kinks' 1968 hit, "Days". The song, however, was unsuccessful. It has also appeared on the Japanese, British, and European versions of Phobia, released in 1993.

The song was a commentary on romanticization of the "Swinging Sixties" culture.

The song also appeared on the compilation album Waterloo Sunset: The Best of The Kinks and Ray Davies.

EP track listing

References

The Kinks songs
1991 singles
Songs written by Ray Davies
Song recordings produced by Ray Davies
1991 songs
Columbia Records singles